The 1962 Delaware Fightin' Blue Hens football team was an American football team that represented the University of Delaware in the Middle Atlantic Conference during the 1962 NCAA College Division football season. In its 12th season under head coach David M. Nelson, the team compiled a 7–2 record (5–0 against MAC opponents), won the MAC University Division championship, and outscored opponents by a total of 219 to 76. John Scholato was the team captain. The team played its home games at Delaware Stadium in Newark, Delaware.

Schedule

References

Delaware
Delaware Fightin' Blue Hens football seasons
Delaware Fightin' Blue Hens football